The Niger women's national under-20 football team represents Niger in international youth women's football competitions.

The team qualified for the 2022 WAFU U20 Women's Cup to be held in Ghana.

See also 
 Niger women's national football team

References 

under-20
African women's national under-20 association football teams